Badilabad (also Romanized as Badīlābād) is a village in Sadan Rostaq-e Gharbi Rural District, in the Central District of Kordkuy County, Golestan Province, Iran. At the 2006 census, its population was 29, in 9 families.

References 

Populated places in Kordkuy County